Ent Credit Union (simply known as Ent) is a community credit union serving a 14 county area in Northern, Central and Southern Colorado with more than $9 billion in assets and more than 470,000 members.

Ent has 50 service centers, online and telephone banking, a call center and a mortgage loan center.

Membership
Ent is a Colorado state community chartered credit union offering membership benefits to all who live, work, worship or attend school in Adams, Arapahoe, Boulder, Broomfield, Denver, Douglas, El Paso, Elbert, Fremont, Jefferson, Larimer, Pueblo, Teller and Weld counties. 

In addition, membership is open to civilian and military personnel of the Colorado Air National Guard, Colorado Army National Guard and those associated with Buckley Space Force Base in Aurora, Colorado.

Family members of Ent members are also eligible to join.

History
Ent was chartered in 1957 to serve military and civilian personnel assigned to Ent Air Force Base (now the United States Olympic Training Center) and Peterson Field (now Peterson Air Force Base) in Colorado Springs, Colorado. Ent and Ent Air Force Base were both named for Major General Uzal Girard Ent, commander of the Ninth Air Force during World War II. Ent Air Force Base opened in 1951 when the United States Air Defense Command moved to Colorado Springs.

Ent's community charter change, to serve El Paso and Teller counties in Colorado was approved by the National Credit Union Administration in 1999. 

Ent's charter was adjusted in 2004 to include underserved areas in Denver County and Pueblo County. 

Ent changed from a federal to a state of Colorado credit union charter on January 1, 2016. In April, its charter was expanded to include Arapahoe, Douglas, Fremont and Jefferson counties. 

Ent's charter was expanded in October 2018 to include Adams, Boulder, Broomfield, Elbert, Larimer and Weld counties.

References

Credit unions based in Colorado
Banks established in 1957
1957 establishments in Colorado